Howard Newton "Sonny" Keys was an American football offensive lineman in the National Football League from 1960 to 1965 with the Philadelphia Eagles. He was born in Orlando, Oklahoma, on January 24, 1935. Sonny was a star athlete for the Pioneers at Stillwater High School in Stillwater, Oklahoma where he played football, basketball, baseball and track.  He was named to the Oklahoma All-State football team and played in the All Stars game and the Oil Bowl.  His high school named Sonny "Mr. Pioneer." He played all positions on the line, including center. He went to college at Oklahoma State University in Stillwater. At OSU, he was part of the Cowboys championship Blue Grass Bowl game which was broadcast by Howard Cosell. Sonny is described as a "mauling defender" in OSU's Heritage Hall Museum in historic Gallagher-Iba Arena. He was drafted in the 12th round of the 1959 NFL Draft. He was a part of Buck Shaw's 1960 NFL Championship season. He played five seasons with the Eagles and was known for knowing and playing every position on the offensive line.  His family was featured in many local advertisements including Food Fair and a dairy distributorship.  His teammate, Tommy McDonald, cited a tough Sonny Keys in the book "They Pay Me to Catch Footballs." In 1965, he joined Jerry Williams of the Calgary Stampeders as an assistant coach.  After the Stampeders went to the Canadian Grey Cup, he chose to return to the NFL as an assistant coach with the Cleveland Browns under head coach Nick Skorich.  After his death from complications of cancer in 1971, the Philadelphia Eagles dedicated their annual Christmas card to his memory.  His outstanding scouting and recruiting abilities made his legacy live on in the NFL.  For example, he brought fellow OSU alum, Jerry Sherk, to the Cleveland Browns, along with other top talents. As part of the 1960s world championship football team, Sonny was inducted into the city of Philadelphia Sports Hall of Fame in 2006.

1935 births
American football offensive linemen
Oklahoma State Cowboys football players
Sportspeople from Oklahoma City
Players of American football from Oklahoma
Philadelphia Eagles players
1971 deaths
Deaths from cancer in Ohio